Power "Kosa Leka" (Lingala for "lie and walk past") is the third studio album by Congolese singer Fally Ipupa. It was released on April 13, 2013 and contains 22 tracks. The album has sold over 30,000 copies in a month. On May 14, 2013, Ipupa won the trophy for "Best African Artist" at the first edition of Trace Urban Music Awards. The album features singles like "Sweet Life "La vie est belle"", "Ndoki" and "Service".
It is also his last album to have been produced by David Monsoh.

Track listing
2013 - Volume 1
Hustler is Back – 8:00
Ndoki – 6:26
Bruce – 9:13
Emeraude – 8:15
Anissa – 7:17
Nourrisson – 8:05
Kosa Leka – 3:58
Cri d’Alarme – 8:08
Mikitisa – 8:32
Amour Assassin – 6:56
Service – 4:38
Sweet Life "La vie est belle" – 3:26
Stop à la Guerre – 4:19
Power 001 – 5:31

2013 - Volume 2
Toi & Moi – 9:01
Terminator – 8:05
Double Clic – 8:25
Pene Pene – 8:16
Likukuma – 7:32
Sony – 7:31
Oxygene – 7:36
We Are the World – 6:50
1000% Mawa – 6:48
Mungala – 5:15
Mokek's – 9:32
Skype – 10:28
Power 001 (Long Version) – 13:48

Singles
 "Sweet Life "La vie est belle"" (2013); music video directed by 'Charly Clodion'
 "Ndoki" (2013); music video directed by 'Dandy'
 "Service" (2013)

Remixed singles
 "Sweet Life "La vie est belle"" Remix featuring Bigg masta G (Muana Mboka) (2013)
 "Ndoki" Remix featuring Bigg masta G (Muana Mboka) (2013)

References

Fally Ipupa albums
2013 albums
Albums produced by David Monsoh
Albums produced by Fally Ipupa